Daly's Bridge is a pedestrian bridge spanning the River Lee in Cork, Ireland. Known locally as the Shakey Bridge, it joins Sunday's Well on the north side to Fitzgerald's Park in the Mardyke area on the south.

Completed in 1926 and opened in 1927, it is the only suspension bridge in Cork City. It was constructed by the London-based David Rowell & Company to the design of Stephen W. Farrington, the Cork City Engineer.

The bridge takes its official name from Cork businessman James Daly, who contributed to the cost of the bridge. Its colloquial name (the "Shakey Bridge" or "Shaky Bridge") derives from the movement of the platform when running or jumping on the bridge.

In August 2019, work began on restoration of the bridge. It was dismantled into four sections and removed so that repair of the bridge structure could be carried out. In July 2020, it was reported that while the structure of the bridge had been reinstalled, "several weeks of work" were required before it would reopen. It was reopened to the public in December 2020. 

The bridge is listed on Cork City Council's Record of Protected Structures.

See also
 Shakkin' Briggie (Over the River Dee in Scotland)

References

1926 establishments in Ireland
Bridges completed in 1926
Bridges in County Cork
Buildings and structures in Cork (city)
Pedestrian bridges in the Republic of Ireland
Suspension bridges in the Republic of Ireland
Tourist attractions in Cork (city)
Transport in Cork (city)